Robert William Garner (born August 17, 1958) is a Canadian former professional ice hockey centre who played in one National Hockey League game for the Pittsburgh Penguins during the 1982–83 NHL season. As a youth, he played in the 1970 and 1971 Quebec International Pee-Wee Hockey Tournaments with a minor ice hockey team from Barrie.

Career statistics

See also
List of players who played only one game in the NHL

References

External links

1958 births
Living people
Baltimore Skipjacks players
Binghamton Dusters players
Binghamton Whalers players
Canadian ice hockey centres
Cincinnati Stingers (CHL) players
Erie Blades players
Ice hockey people from Toronto
Pittsburgh Penguins draft picks
Pittsburgh Penguins players
Syracuse Firebirds players
Toronto Marlboros players